The seventh season of the Bleach anime series is named the . In the English adaptation of the anime released by Viz Media, the title of the season is translated as The Hueco Mundo. The episodes are directed by Noriyuki Abe, and produced by TV Tokyo, Dentsu and Studio Pierrot. The season adapts Tite Kubo's Bleach manga series from the rest of the 26th volume to the 28th volume (chapters 229–251), with the exception of episodes 132–137 (filler) and 147–149 (canon expansion). The season follows Ichigo Kurosaki's journey to Hueco Mundo to rescue Orihime Inoue, who was kidnapped by the arrancar under the command of former Soul Reaper captain Sōsuke Aizen. Although a small story arc focused on the character Ashido Kanō was not featured in the manga as was originally intended due to timing issues, Kubo helped the anime staff produce the episodes for it.

The season aired from July 4 to December 5, 2007. The English adaptation of the Bleach anime is licensed by Viz Media, and the season aired from July 11 to September 26, 2009, on Cartoon Network's Adult Swim in the United States. Five DVD compilations, each containing four episodes of the season, were released by Aniplex between December 19, 2007 and April 23, 2008 in Japan. While Viz Media released a single DVD volume on September 21, 2010 featuring the season's first episodes, the entire season has only been released within others DVDs. Episodes 132 and 133 were also released in Viz's seventh English DVD box on December 21, 2010. Episodes 134–145 were released on March 22, 2011 as Viz's eighth compilation while the remaining ones were released on June 21, 2011. Manga Entertainment released the first volume from the season on September 26, 2011, while the second one is due to October 17, 2011. A collection of the two volumes was released on December 12, 2011.

The episodes use four pieces of theme music: two opening themes and two closing themes. The opening themes are "Alones" by Aqua Timez, used for the first twelve episodes, and "After Dark" by Asian Kung-Fu Generation, used for the remaining episodes. To promote the second Bleach featured film, Bleach: The DiamondDust Rebellion, the opening and closing credits for episode 151 use footage from the film, which was released on December 22, 2007.



Episode list

References

General

Specific

2007 Japanese television seasons
Season 07